HD 110073 is a star in the southern constellation Centaurus, near the southern constellation border with Crux. It has the Bayer designation l Centauri  (lower case L), while HD 110073 is the star's identifier from the Henry Draper catalogue. This system is faintlyvisible to the naked eye with an apparent visual magnitude of +4.63. It is located at a distance of approximately 365 light years from the Sun based on parallax, and is drifting further away with a radial velocity of +15 km/s.

This is a single-lined spectroscopic binary star system that belongs to the Pleiades stream. The primary component is a mercury-manganese star with a stellar classification of B8II/III. These stars are often helium-weak, but this is one of the most normal members of this group in terms of helium abundance. The system is a source for X-ray emission, which is most likely coming from the lower mass companion – it may even be a pre-main-sequence star.

References 

B-type bright giants
Mercury-manganese stars
Pre-main-sequence stars
Spectroscopic binaries

Centaurus (constellation)
Centauri, l
Durchmusterung objects
110073
061789
4817